François Derand (born between 1588 and 1591, Vic-sur-Seille; died 29 October 1644, Agde) was a French Jesuit architect.

Life

After studying for the noviciate in Rouen, then at the Jesuit college in La Flèche (where he taught maths for two years), he was ordained a priest in 1621 and entered the Society of Jesus. Initially he lived in Rouen then Rennes, where he was consulted on the work to rebuild the Cathédrale Sainte-Croix d'Orléans. In 1629, he moved to complete the Église Saint-Paul-Saint-Louis, begun by Étienne Martellange. He also took part in several other works - the altarpiece of Laval and the high altar of the Jesuit church at La Flèche. In 1643 he published 'L’architecture des voûtes', a treatise on stereotomy that is considered his masterwork. He was summoned to Agde the same year and died there in 1644. He was buried in the Jesuit college at Béziers.

Notes

Sources
 Babelon, Jean-Pierre (1996). "Derand, Père François", vol. 8, p. 775, in The Dictionary of Art, 34 volumes, edited by Jane Turner. New York: Grove. .
  Pérouse de Montclos, Jean-Marie (2009). Biography of François Derand on Architectura
  Coupole de Saint-Paul-Saint-Louis on insecula

1590 births
1644 deaths
17th-century French Jesuits
17th-century French architects
French Baroque architects